Obra D. Tompkins High School (OTHS) is a high school located in unincorporated Fort Bend County, Texas in Greater Katy, within Greater Houston. The school is part of the Katy Independent School District.

Tompkins was created to relieve the overflow of students in the neighboring Seven Lakes High School which had almost 4,000 students during the 2012–2013 school year. In August 2013, Tompkins opened with only freshman and sophomore classes, but had students in grades 9-12 beginning in August 2015.

The school is named for Obra D. Tompkins, a long-serving educator in the Katy school district. It is located off Falcon Landing Blvd. and Gaston Road at the edge of the Cinco Ranch Line.

Campus
Tompkins is a  facility on a  plot and has a design almost exactly like that of Seven Lakes. The Tompkins campus may house around 4,000 students. Gilbane Building Co. built the school while PBK Architects designed the school.

Feeder patterns
The following elementary schools feed into O.D. Tompkins High School:
Davidson Elementary
Jenks Elementary (partial) 
Shafer Elementary (partial)
Wilson Elementary (partial)
WoodCreek Elementary (partial)
Kilpatrick Elementary (partial)
Rylander Elementary (partial)

The following junior high schools feed into O.D. Tompkins High School:
WoodCreek Junior High (partial)
Tays Junior High
Cinco Ranch Junior High (partial)

Notable alumni 

 Bárbara Olivieri – professional soccer player, C.F. Monterrey and the Venezuelan women's national team

References

External links

 

Public high schools in Fort Bend County, Texas
Katy Independent School District high schools
2013 establishments in Texas
Educational institutions established in 2013